Five Bad Men is a 1935 American Western film directed by Clifford S. Smith, starring Noah Beery Jr., Bill Patton, and Jay Wilsey.

Cast
 Noah Beery Jr. as Gene Taggart
 Bill Patton as Bad man
 Jay Wilsey (credited as Buffalo Bill Jr.) as Bad man
 Hal Taliaferro credited as Wally Wales) as Bad man
 Pete Morrison as Bad man
 Art Mix as Bad man
 William Desmond as Mattoon
 Billy Franey as Billy
 Frank Yaconelli as Tony
 Steve Clemento as Rodriguez
 Claude Hart as Sam
 Shirley Wells as Olga
 Louise Larabee as Marie
 Jack Rockwell
 Helen Gibson as Mrs. Swift
 Tom London as Gangster
 Lew Meehan as Gangster
 Pat Harmon as Cafe manager
 Duke R. Lee as Sheriff
 Sally Dolling as Janet Bartlett
 Edward Coxen as Sim Bartlett
 Bartlett Carré as Lige Jenkins
 Mrs. Jack Hoxie as Mrs. Jenkins

References

External links

1935 Western (genre) films
1935 films
American Western (genre) films
American black-and-white films
Films with screenplays by Harry L. Fraser
Films directed by Clifford Smith
1930s American films
1930s English-language films